The Ponce Grand Prix de Atletismo is a track and field competition held yearly in Ponce, Puerto Rico at the Francisco Montaner Stadium. The event started in 2007, after the successful hosting of the 2006 Ibero-American Championships. It was considered among the most important athletic events in the Caribbean based on the competitive and organizational quality of the event. Starting with the 2012 season, the Ponce Grand Prix joined the IAAF World Challenge competitions until 2015 and represented the only other city in the Americas, outside Kingston, Jamaica, and Rio de Janeiro, Brazil in the circuit. The event was relaunched in 2022 named Puerto Rico International Athletics Classic as part of the silver level scheduled World Athletics Continental Tour.

History

In early seasons the event was one of three competitions in the IAAF-NACAC circuit beside the Adidas Track Classic in Carson, California, and the Jamaica Invitational in Kingston, Jamaica, where competitors accumulated points in the IAAF rankings system.

The 2009 Ponce Grand Prix was witnessed live by some 9,000 fans at the Francisco Montaner Stadium, plus hundreds of thousands more throughout the Americas via satellite television. This edition was considered to have initiated “the greatest feat in Puerto Rican sports history”, as new records were established, and a local hero surfaced, Javier Culson, competing in the 400 metres hurdles. He was later crowned Athlete of the Year in Puerto Rico.

The relaunched 2022 edition saw eleven meet records fall with eight of them were Puerto Rican all-comers' records.

Meet records

Men

Women

References

External links

Puerto Rico International Athletics Classic official website
Ponce Grand Prix de Atletismo archieved website

Sports events in Ponce, Puerto Rico
Athletics in Puerto Rico
Entertainment events in Puerto Rico
Recurring sporting events established in 2007
May sporting events
Annual events in Puerto Rico
Events in Ponce, Puerto Rico
2007 establishments in Puerto Rico